WBIB-FM (89.1 FM) is a radio station licensed to serve the community of Forsyth, Georgia. The station is owned by Believers in Broadcasting, Inc., and airs a Christian format.

The station was assigned the WBIB-FM call letters by the Federal Communications Commission on March 25, 2008.

References

External links
 Official Website
 

Radio stations established in 2011
2011 establishments in Georgia (U.S. state)
BIB-FM
Monroe County, Georgia